Youssef Hassan may refer to:
 Yousef Hassan (born 1996), Qatari football goalkeeper for Al-Gharafa
 Youssef Hassan (footballer, born 1999), Egyptian football forward for Shams
 Youssef Hassan (footballer, born 2003), Egyptian football striker for Shamalek